The Only Harmless Great Thing is a 2018 alternate history story by Brooke Bolander, exploring the conjunction of Topsy the Elephant and the Radium Girls scandal. It was published by Tor.com.

The title is taken from John Donne's 1612 poem The Progress of the Soul, and is his description of an elephant.

Synopsis
In a world where sign language communication with elephants became possible in the 1880s, but they were still considered animals for several decades more, US Radium has purchased several (including Topsy) to replace their litigious human employees, because elephants can tolerate higher doses of radiation. Decades in the future, a scientist tries to persuade the elephant community to allow themselves to become long-time nuclear waste warning messages.

Reception
The Only Harmless Great Thing won the Nebula Award for Best Novelette of 2018 and the 2019 Locus Award for Best Novelette, and was a finalist for the 2019 Hugo Award for Best Novelette, and the 2019 Theodore Sturgeon Memorial Award.

Kirkus Reviews found it to be "rich (and) poetic", and observed that its "commentary around workers' rights, animal rights, and women’s rights" produces "a work grounded in injustice and outrage" which "never feels preachy", but also noted that Bolander's "gorgeous and vigorous" prose can hinder readability, as can the "frequent scene shifts". Publishers Weekly considered it to be "disjointed" and "hard to follow", with little "plot or (...) emotional hook", but nonetheless stated that Bolander's "lyrical writing is pleasant".

Origins
Bolander has described the story as the result of having read a Twitter poll in which Helena Bell asked which of several options she should write about next; two of the options were "elephants" and "radium poisoning".

References

External links
Fire, Phantoms, and What Didn’t Make it into The Only Harmless Great Thing, story fragments which Bolander wrote but ultimately did not use

Nebula Award for Best Novelette-winning works
2018 short stories
Alternate history short stories